"The Butler Did It (A Bird in the Hand)" is the fifth produced episode (but the third broadcast) of the TV series Police Squad! it was written by Pat Proft and directed by Georg Stanford Brown. It was produced by Robert K. Weiss.

Plot
The episode starts with a party organized by a Mr. Burton for his daughter, Terri, her 18th birthday. As the band is playing "Happy Birthday" Mr. Burton tells the band to play "something different". The band then actually plays a song entitled "Something Different". The butler then comes bringing in the cake. When she has blown out the candles her boyfriend Kingsley, comes to her, he wants to speak with her in the Japanese Garden (a garden filled with Japanese people standing in pots).

While they are discussing marriage a man comes out of the bushes, grabs Terri and knocks out Kingsley. Then we see Frank and Ed, at the scene of the crime talking about the ransom note that they found. The demand is $1 million. When Frank and Ed are questioning Mr. and Mrs. Burton the phone rings. It's the kidnapper, and Frank orders Norberg to get a tap on the phone, only this doesn't work in time.

The next day Frank decides to talk to the only witness to the kidnapping, Kingsley Addison. Kingsley plays basketball every day at the Shorewood Highschool playground. Frank decides to meet him there. While joining Kingsley's basketball game Frank discovers that he owed money to a lot of people. When Frank leaves he receives a phone call from Ed, saying that the kidnapper(s) contacted Mr. and Mrs. Burton again, with some additional information. A tape came in with the mail. When Frank, Ed and Norberg listen to the tape, they hear some strange noises in the background. When at the scene Ed says: "We don't even have the spot for the ransom drop yet." A mime falls in to the window to sign them they have to drop the ransom Thursday at the bus depot at ten o'clock.

Act Two: Ball III

Frank decides to go to the lab and see what Ted has come up with. Ted shows Frank that the noises on the tape that was delivered are a bell and a foghorn, the kind of type you would associate with the ocean, or the lakefront.

When Frank and Ed drive around for a couple of hours they end up at the gas station where they discover that the foghorn is not a foghorn but a tuba, and the bell is the bell from the gas station. When Frank and Ed have checked almost every tuba store in the city, they come to a dead end. Frank decides to go to his own private source, Johnny, who tells Frank that they have just opened up a new store called the El Tubadera club. Then Tommy Lasorda arrives and consults with Johnny about his pitching rotation.

When Frank gets there he sees the kidnapper coming out of the building holding Terri Burton. A big gunfight starts, Ed comes by and tries to get behind the kidnapper. He yells:"cover me!" and Frank covers him with a blanket. Ed goes everywhere but near the kidnapper, and trips over a couple of trash cans. When the kidnapper tries to run, because he's out of bullets, he trips over Ed and Frank arrests him. Frank takes off the kidnappers mask and reveals that he is the butler.

Recurring jokes
Tonight's special guest star: Robert Goulet, who is shot by firing squad. Goulet would later appear in The Naked Gun 2½ as the main antagonist Quentin Hapsburg.
Next week's experiment: Ten things you can do with a carrot.
Johnny's next customer: Tommy Lasorda, who wants to know if he needs another pitcher on his team; Johnny chides him for giving up Tommy John.
Freeze frame gag: The chimpanzee in the office throws papers all over the office.

References

External links

 

Police Squad! episodes
1982 American television episodes